This article documents the history of Negeri Sembilan Football Club, a Malaysian association football team. For a general overview of the club, see Negeri Sembilan FC.

The club was established in 1923, according to a passage in the football history books of Malaysia based on an interview with Austin Senevirathe, who was 93 years old when interviewed. He spoke about a match that happened between PBNS and Singapore for the Malaya Cup in that particular year.

The club is one of the top competing teams in the history of football since its establishment. They have won many top competitions in Malaysia, starting in the early 1940s. The club also gave rise to many Malaysian football stars who brought success to both club and country such as Kwan Soon Teck, Mok Wai Hong, B. Rajinikandh, N. Thanabalan, B. Sathianathan, Ching Hong Aik, Shukor Adan, Norhafiz Zamani Misbah, Aidil Zafuan, Zaquan Adha, Farizal Marlias, S. Kunanlan, Shahurain Abu Samah and many more.

Throughout 2003–2011 there was a "golden generation" for the Negeri Sembilan team because, throughout the year, the team achieved a lot of success in competitions at the domestic level. Starting with winning the FA Cup in 2003, the team managed to win the Super League in 2006. The most proud performance was when Negeri Sembilan successfully made it through the Malaysia Cup final stage three years in a row from 2009 to 2011. The team won two finals in 2009 and 2011, and in 2010, the team became runners-up when they had to accept a defeat, but they managed to win the FA Cup in the same year (2010). In addition, this golden era also saw the emergence of several big names who were with the Negeri Sembilan team in the Malaysian football scene, including Ching Hong Aik, Shukor Adan, Norhafiz Zamani, Khairul Anuar Baharom, Bekamenga Bekamengo, Sani Anuar, Rezal Zambery, Zaquan Adha, Aidil Zafuan, Farizal Marlias, S. Kunanlan and Shahurain.

20s (1923–1929) 
The club was established in 1923, according to a passage in the football history books of Malaysia based on an interview with Austin Senevirathe, who was 93 years old when interviewed. He stated that the Malaya Cup match between Negeri Sembilan and Singapore took place in that particular year.

In 1926 the Football Associations of Negeri Sembilan, Perak, Selangor, Malacca and the Singapore Amateur Football Association, came together to form the Malayan Football Association (MFA), to field a Malayan team against an Australia side that visited Singapore that year.

In 1927 PBNS started organising league matches. Among the trophies that were up for grabs at that time were the Annex Shield, the British Resident's Cup, and the Hose Cup. The earliest football clubs that existed and competed in the league were Negri Sembilan Chinese "A," Negri Sembilan Club, Port Dickson Recreation Club, Sungei Ujong Club, Negri Sembilan Chinese "B," and St. Paul's Old Boys Association.

40s (1940–1949) 
In 1942–1947 all football competitions in Malaya were suspended due to World War II and the Japanese occupation of Malaya. This also caused the Negeri Sembilan team to stop participating in league and cup competitions until 1948, when the team was able to compete again.

In 1948 they won the first HMS Malaya Cup, led by skipper Kwan Soon Teck .

50s (1950–1959) 
In 1953 Negeri Sembilan finished as runners-up in the Kings Gold Cup after being defeated by Kedah in the final with a 4–1 score.

80s (1980–1989) 
In 1982 Tan Sri Dato' Seri Utama Mohd Isa bin Dato' Haji Abdul Samad was appointed president of the Negeri Sembilan Football Association (PBNS) as well as the Menteri Besar of Negeri Sembilan. Also in 1982, the Perbandaran Seremban Field was upgraded, and throughout that period, the team used the Kuala Pilah Stadium (a contemporary stadium) as their home ground where they had previously used the Perbandaran Seremban Field. Later, the field was renamed the Perbandaran Seremban Stadium and began to be used until 1991.

Negeri Sembilan played in the Liga Malaysia (English: Malaysia League) throughout the years 1982–1988, Liga Malaysia was an amateur football league run by the Football Association of Malaysia (FAM). Since 1982, Negeri Sembilan has only been a middle-tier team and is not very prominent when compared to Selangor, Singapore, Kuala Lumpur, Pahang, and Penang.

In 1989 Liga Malaysia changed its status from amateur to semi-pro. The Semi-Pro League was introduced and divided into two tiers, the Division 1 League for the first tier and the Division 2 League for the second tier. Negeri Sembilan was placed in Division 2 according to their current performance. The team is only in an average position in Division 2 despite having used the services of Singapore international player R. Suriamurthy and Thailand import player Likit Sanatong.

90s (1990–1999) 
1991 was the year of the revival of the Negeri Sembilan team, which in previous years had been an underdog. That was also the last year the Negeri Sembilan team used the Majlis Perbandaran Seremban Stadium before the Tuanku Abdul Rahman Stadium in Paroi was used as their home ground until now. On 18 August 1991, the team met Sarawak in the final match of the Division 2 League at the Majlis Perbandaran Seremban Stadium. Negeri Sembilan, who was in first place at the time, only needed a draw while Sarawak, who was in second place, needed a win to get the top spot in the league table. The match of that day went to Negeri Sembilan with a result of 2–2, and they managed to collect one point. It was the last year that led to the success of winning the Semi-Pro League Division 2, then qualifying for Division 1 in 1992. Among the star players at that time were the import trio, the Bozik Brothers (Miroslav and Robert), and the powerful striker Marian Vazquez. Local players include Richard Scully, Mansor Sulaiman, and Nazari Hussein.

In 1992 the construction of Tuanku Abdul Rahman Stadium was completed and inaugurated to be used as a multipurpose stadium. The stadium initially held a capacity of 20,000 people, and since then, the Negeri Sembilan team has officially made the stadium their home ground for the Liga Semi-Pro Divisyen 1 tournament in that year.

On 12 April 1992 the Negeri Sembilan team won the 1992 Kings' Gold Cup after beating Terengganu FA, 2–1, at Tuanku Abdul Rahman Stadium, Paroi. The coaches and players shared a cash reward of RM20,000 from the Negeri Sembilan Malay Football Association. Negeri Sembilan's coach at that time was Haji Mohd Zaki Shaikh Ahmad. Earlier, the last time Negeri Sembilan FA participated in the final of the trophy was in 1953, when they lost 1–2 to Pulau Pinang.

In the 1996 season Negeri Sembilan became one of the contenders for the league title. Even though it was not given much attention at first, the team starring two former import players from Argentina, Pahang FA's Gus Cerro and Jose Iriarte, surprised many when they gave great competition to other selected teams such as Selangor, Sabah, Sarawak, Kedah, Pahang, and Brunei. Othman Katmon, Faizal Zainal, Khairil Zainal, Rosli Omar, B. Rajinikandh (now converted to Islam), A. Ganeson, V. Arumugham, Idris Kadir, Azmi Mohamed, and Ching Hong Aik (only a few mentions) have put up a good fight, giving great hope to their loyal supporters. However, this squad failed to maintain the momentum when it was finally overtaken by Sabah FA, who emerged as the Premier League champion, as well as Kedah FA, who became the runner-up.

2000s (2000–2004) 
On 31 May 2003 Negeri Sembilan met Perlis in the FA Cup final. Played at Perak Stadium, the club was surprised by the opponent's early goal in the 11th minute. The club managed to close the gap in the 56th minute thanks to a goal by Effendi Malek. The game remained 1–1 until the 90th minute, and in extra time, victory was decided on a golden goal. In the 95th minute, the club managed to get the golden goal as a result of Everson Martinelli's goal, and the club was crowned FA Cup champion in 2003.

In 2004 the capacity of Negeri Sembilan's Tuanku Abdul Rahman Stadium was upgraded to 45,000 people for the hosting of the 2004 Sukma Games. This benefitted Negeri Sembilan fans as the numbers of maximum spectators increased and was best used for the big match such as a derby or a final match.

Negeri Sembilan made its first appearance in the AFC Cup competition in the 2004 season. The club made its debut in the first match against Island FC with a big 6–0 win on 10 February 2004. However, the club had to settle for being 3rd in the group after losing all the group stage matches against Geylang United, East Bengal, and Island FC. All teams played at home and away for a total of six games.

In March 2004 Datuk Seri Mohamad Hasan was appointed as the president of the Negeri Sembilan Football Association (PBNS). It's because he successfully held the position as the 10th Menteri Besar of Negeri Sembilan and replaced Isa Samad, who held that position the previous year. Mohamad Hasan was the first Menteri Besar who had ever been a local football player and then became the president of PBNS. He never represented the first team of Negeri Sembilan but played a lot with clubs in Kuala Lumpur and Selangor. He was banned from football for life after receiving a red card when NS Malays played against NS Indians in 1977. He was active in football in the 1970s.

2000s (2005–2009) 
In the 2006 season the team won the Malaysia Super League by finishing first out of eight clubs that competed. The newly promoted team from the Malaysian Premier League in the 2005 season managed to become the league champion in their first appearance since the Super League was introduced in 2004.

On 7 November 2009 the team ended their 61-year drought in the Malaysia Cup after posting a convincing 3–1 victory over Kelantan in the final at the National Stadium, Bukit Jalil. The team also won all the matches in the Malaysia Cup tournament, starting from the group stage until the final. That final match was a fantastic night.

The repeat final of 2009 between the club and Kelantan happened again on 30 October 2010. However, this time, the club lost 1–2 to Kelantan despite having taken an early lead through a penalty by Shahurain Abu Samah.

2010s (2010–2014) 
On 10 April 2010 Negeri Sembilan needed the luck of the penalty shootout to win the FA Cup championship again by beating Kedah 5–4 in the final of the 21st edition at the National Stadium, Bukit Jalil. This continues to confirm them as the new powerhouse of national football after winning the Malaysia Cup last season. Both teams were tied at 1–1 after the end of the 90 minutes of the actual game, even after the referee, R. Krishnan, dragged it into extra time in front of about 70,000 spectators, the majority of whom were "Hijau Kuning" supporters.

In 2011 the club again qualified for the Malaysia Cup Final for the third time in a row, this time with their new coach, Mohd Azraai Khor Abdullah. They won the trophy after defeating Terengganu FA with an epic comeback. The first goal was scored by Mohd Ashaari Shamsuddin for Terengganu in the 59th minute. Negeri Sembilan used the last 10 minutes of the game to make a comeback. S. Kunanlan equalised the score in the 81st minute before Hairuddin Omar, the veteran striker, hit the winning goal for Negeri Sembilan with a beautiful volley in the 85th minute.

In the early part of the 2011 season one of the team's all-time best coaches, Wan Jamak Wan Hassan, resigned from the club. He sees no excuses for the team's disappointing run in the Malaysia Super League and Malaysia FA Cup competitions for that season.

On 2012 Negeri Sembilan signed nine new faces, including two import players, to cover the "Hoben Jang Hoben" squad challenged in the Super League 2012 season. Two import players, a striker from Cameroon named Jean-Emmanuel Effa Owona and a defender from Brazil named Gonçalves Ferreira Marquen, were offered a one-year contract as the latest additions to the backup squad to help the Jangs form a strong team.

On 7 January 2021 Negeri Sembilan lifted the 2012 Malaysian season's opening Charity Shield when they beat Kelantan 2–1 in the match that was played at the National Stadium in Bukit Jalil. Cameroonian striker Jean-Emmanuel Effa Owona emerged as the hero for Negeri with a brace of goals in the 31st and 63rd minutes to erase Kelantan's earlier goal off Norshahrul Idlan in the 22nd minute.

2010s (2015–2019) 
On 6 December 2014 the president of the Negeri Sembilan Football Association announced that the Negeri Sembilan team would be known as the Negeri Sembilan Matrix from the 2015 season. This has become the beginning of the process of privatising the Negeri Sembilan.

In 2015, overall Negeri Sembilan did not play as expected. The club has invested heavily in the team, but they are only 6th in the league and knocked out early in the FA Cup. even more disappointing when they failed to qualify for the Malaysia Cup. On 26 August 2015, the Negeri Sembilan Football Association disbanded the Premier League team NS Matrix, shortly after the team failed to qualify for the Malaysia Cup 2015. Also eliminated is the head coach, K. Devan.

On 25 December 2015 Negeri Sembilan successfully defeated Perlis in the Kings Gold Cup match with a 2–1 win at Tuanku Syed Putra Stadium. This success ended Negeri Sembilan's 23-year drought since 1992 and brought home the round trophy and RM40,000 in cash, while the runner-up received RM20,000 in cash.

In December 2016 the club signed several new players. Among them were Lee Tuck, Bruno Suzuki, and Nemanja Vidic. Played in the 2017 Malaysia Premier League, the club has a mission to climb up for the Malaysia Super League. On 4 March 2017, Negeri Sembilan continued to be on top of the Premier League when they defeated Kuala Lumpur 2–1 at the Tuanku Abdul Rahman Stadium, Paroi. Negeri Sembilan was successfully promoted to the Super League for 2018 despite only being in 5th place. The club managed to qualify for the semi-finals of the FA Cup, and on 13 May 2017, the FA Cup semi-final second leg against Pahang ended with a 2–1 victory over Pahang with an aggregate of 3–1. Negeri Sembilan was previously defeated by a score of 1–0 in the first match at Darul Makmur Stadium.

On 7 June 2018 the Negeri Sembilan Football Association (PBNS) lost an experienced figure when Datuk Seri Mohamad Hasan resigned as president of the association. Also followed Mohamad's footsteps were two vice presidents, Datuk Mohamad Haslah Mohd Amin, who was also the PBNS Chief Finance Officer and manager of the Negeri Sembilan Super League team, and lastly, Datuk Abd Ghani Hasan.

On 10 September 2018 Tunku Besar of Tampin, Tunku Syed Razman Tunku Syed Idrus Al-Qadri, was elected as the new President of the Negeri Sembilan Football Association (PBNS) for the period of 2018–2021 after winning unopposed at the 86th PBNS Congress, held at Klana Resort.

2020s (2020–present) 
Until 2020 the team competes within the capacity of the Football Association (FA). However, the team has finally succeeded in being privatised in the football club privatisation campaign by the Football Association of Malaysia (FAM) in September 2020 and has been performing as a "football club" (FC) since the 2021 season.

Season 2021 was the club's third year playing in the Premier League since being relegated in 2019. On 26 December 2020, the club signed several new players. Among them were Raja Imran Shah, Raja Amin, Barathkumar Ramaloo, Aroon Kumar, Damien Lim, Saiful Ridzuwan Selamat, Annas Rahmat, and Ferris Danial. The club also signed Tasnim Fitri and Osman Yusoff. Having started the season well with an unbeaten record after six games, the club has been top of the table for several weeks. The great competitor for the team at that time was Sarawak United. That event was almost similar in 1991 when Negeri Sembilan and Sarawak competed for the top spot in League Division 2. However, Negeri Sembilan has shown dominance by successfully winning the Premier League in the 2021 season, while Sarawak United FC placed second.

Names 

 1923–2005: Negeri Sembilan
In tournaments the Negeri Sembilan Football Association only used Negeri Sembilan or Negri Sembilan as the team name. Negeri Sembilan is the name of one of the states in Malaysia, and the Negeri Sembilan Football Association is the governing body of football, founded to represent the state. The team used it from 1923 through 2004 before it was rebranded in 2005.
 2005–2008: Negeri Sembilan Naza
Negeri Sembilan was rebranded in 2015. The team, sponsored by a motor company from Malaysia named Naza, started in 2015. This has caused Negeri Sembilan to be given a new name: Negeri Sembilan Naza, or simply NS Naza, to represent the name of the sponsoring company.
 2009–2014: Negeri Sembilan
In 2009, Naza withdrew from sponsoring the Negeri Sembilan football team. The team later cancelled the name Negeri Sembilan Naza and changed it back to Negeri Sembilan for the 2009 league season. They have used it until season 2014.
 2015: Negeri Sembilan Matrix 
On 6 December 2014 the president of the Negeri Sembilan Football Association (PBNS) announced the team's new branding by changing it to Negeri Sembilan Matrix, or simply NS Matrix. With a larger amount of sponsorship from Matrix Concepts Holdings Berhad and a bigger investment for the team, they had a greater vision and mission to carry out. Unfortunately, on 25 August 2015, NS Matrix was disbanded for not meeting the expectations set by PBNS.
 2016–2020: Negeri Sembilan
Due to the disbandment of NS Matrix in the previous year, the team used the Negeri Sembilan name again starting in 2016. The team used it for 4 years until 2020, when they started using the new name because they had registered as a private football club. 
 2020–present: Negeri Sembilan F.C.
To achieve the targeted standards and the campaign implemented by the Football Association of Malaysia (FAM), the Negeri Sembilan team has privatised their team to become a football club. Previously operating as a football association, the team has started a new chapter with the privatisation of their football team.

Grounds 

 1940s–1982: Seremban Municipal Council Field

Around the 1940s, Negeri Sembilan started playing at Seremban Municipal Council Field since it was built by the British Resident of Negeri Sembilan, John Vincent Cowgill, in the early 1940. Seremban Municipal Council Field, or better known as Padang Stesyen (English: Station Field) because it was located next to the Seremban railway station, has a sweet history for Negeri Sembilan since it was the first venue where the HMS Malaya Cup was lifted by the team. In the beginning, this field did not have seating facilities, and spectators only sat on the sides of the field. In 1960, after Independence Day, this field was upgraded by building 500 seats that can accommodate about 5,000 people.

In 1973, Padang Stesyen was upgraded to allow the field to be used for the Field Hockey World Cup in 1975, when Malaysia was chosen as the host country and Padang Stesyen became one of the competition venues. At this time the seats were increased to 5,000 uncovered seats, which made Padang Stesyen famous at the time due to the good pitch conditions for a world-class tournament.

 1982: Kuala Pilah Stadium

Kuala Pilah Mini Stadium, or Kuala Pilah Stadium, was used as the temporary home ground of the Negeri Sembilan team in 1982. The stadium located in Kuala Pilah was used because Padang Stesyen was being upgraded at that time.

 1982–1992: Seremban Municipal Council Stadium

In 1982, Padang Stesyen was upgraded by the Negeri Sembilan government due to Seremban being upgraded as a city. This also caused the name of the field to be changed to Seremban Municipal Council Stadium. The Negeri Sembilan team reused this field as their home ground until 1992, when that was the last year the team used the stadium, and it became the starting point for the revival of the Negeri Sembilan team. This iconic stadium was later demolished to make way for the development of Seremban and construction of a shopping centre in 1993.

 1992: Tuanku Abdul Rahman Stadium

The Tuanku Abdul Rahman Stadium (STAR) (Malay: Stadium Tuanku Abdul Rahman), also known by its informal name Stadium Paroi and nickname "The STAR of Paroi," is a multi-purpose stadium in Paroi, Negeri Sembilan, Malaysia. Inaugurated in 1992, the stadium initially held a capacity of 20,000 people. Negeri Sembilan has been using the STAR as their home ground since 1992, and this stadium has been the place where various glorious histories of the Negeri Sembilan team were created. The stadium is named in honour of Tuanku Abdul Rahman ibni Almarhum Tuanku Muhammad, the eighth Yamtuan Besar of Seri Menanti, the second Yamtuan Besar of modern-day Negeri Sembilan, and the first Yang di-Pertuan Agong of Malaysia. In 2004, the capacity of the stadium had been upgraded to 45,000 people for the hosting of the 2004 Sukma Games.

Honours

Domestic competitions

League 

 Division 1 / Premier 1 / Super League
 Winners (1):  2006
 Runner-up (1): 2008
 Division 2 / Premier 2 / Premier League
 Winners (2): 1991, 2021
 Runner-up (1): 2005
 Division 3 / FAM League / Piala FAM
 Runner-up (1): 1956

U21 team 

 President's Cup
 Winners (2): 2001, 2002
 Runner-up (1): 1993

Cups 

 Malaysia Cup
 Winners (3): 1948, 2009, 2011
 Runner-up (3): 2000, 2006, 2010
 FA Cup
 Winners (2): 2003, 2010
 Charity Cup
 Winners (1): 2012
 Runner-up (2): 2004, 2010
 Federal Territory Minister Cup
 Winners (1): 2022

Asian 

 AFC Cup

 Group stage: 2004, 2007
 Withdrew: 2010

Presidents 
List of Negeri Sembilan Football Association (PBNS) presidents.

Coaches 

List of Negeri Sembilan FC (NSFC) coaches.

Notable players 
This list displays a line of current and former players who contributed a lot to the team and are considered prominent players. List of players who became the main pillar of success in the team, players who started to shine while with the team, players who were national players while with the team, players who got appearances for the national team while with the team, players who were loved by the fans and the team, players who contributed a lot of appearances, assists, and goals, players who have served for a long time to become legendary figures for the team, and players who are the primary reason for the team's revival.

Foreign players 
 Argentina
 Jose Iriarte
 Luciano Osmar
 Julio Hector Ceballos
 Raul Daniel Cojan
 Emanuel de Porras
 Bruno Martelotto
 Nicolás Vélez

 Angola
 Freddy

 Australia
 Gustavo Cerro
 Pedro Ricoy
 Scott Ollerenshaw
 Jason Williams
 Taylor Regan
 Andrew Nabbout
 Joel Chianese

 Brazil
 Everson Martinelli
 Pedro Paulo Oliveira
 Marquem
 Fábio Leandro Barbosa
 Airton Andrioli
 Henrique
 Alex Moraes
 Flávio Beck Júnior
 Matheus Vila
 Almir
 Igor Luiz
 Arthur Cunha
 Diogo Campos
 Rafinha
 Matheus Alves
 Gustavo
 Casagrande
 Vinicius Leonel

 Cameroon
 Christian Bekamenga
 Anicet Eyenga
 Jean-Emmanuel Effa Owona
 William Modibo
 Alain Akono

 Croatia
 Ivan Babić
 Marko Šimić

 Czech Republic
 Vítězslav Mooc

 England
 Lee Tuck

 France
 Jonathan Béhé
 Goran Jerković
 Herold Goulon
 Gabon

 Lévy Madinda

 Ghana
 David Mawutor
 Haiti
 Jean Alexandre

 Japan
 Bruno Suzuki
 Shunsuke Nakatake

 Kenya
 Eric Muranda

 Laos
 Prak Mony Udom
 Latvia
 Renārs Rode

 Liberia
 Buston Nagbe Browne
 Francis Forkey Doe

 Netherlands
 Pascal Heije

 Nigeria
 Cajetan Ndubuisi Oparaugo
 Abdulrazak Ekpoki
 Alfred Effiong
 Lateef Seriki
 Julius Ejueyitsi
 Udo Fortune

 Palestine
 Yashir Pinto

 Philippines
 Ángel Guirado
 Omid Nazari

 Saint Vincent and the Grenadines
 Shandel Samuel

 Serbia
 Nemanja Vidić

 Sierra Leone
 Lamin Conteh
 Thomas Koroma

 Singapore
 R. Suriamurthy
 Madhu Mohana
 Safuwan Baharudin

 Slovakia
 Robert Bôžik
 Miroslav Bôžik
 Marian Valach
 Marián Juhás
 Jozef Kapláň
 Marian Farbák
 Tomáš Chovanec

 South Africa
 Philani Kubheka

 South Korea
 Kim Jin-yong
 Kim Do-heon
 Bae Beom-geun

 Switzerland
 Kevin Günter

 Thailand
 Likit Sanatong

 Togo
 Francis Koné
 Kossi Adetu

 United States
 Alex Smith

 Yugoslavia
 Esad Sejdic

 Zambia
 Noel Rodwell Mwandila

Season by season records 
Updated on 13 May 2019.

Note:

 Pld = Played, W = Won, D = Drawn, L = Lost, F = Goals for, A = Goals against, Pts= Points, Pos = Position

Individual player awards

M-League Golden boot winners

M-League Top goalscorers

Kit manufacturers and financial sponsor

References

External links 
 

Negeri Sembilan FA
History of Negeri Sembilan FA
History of football in Malaysia
History of association football by club